Ochodaeus is a genus of beetles belonging to the family Ochodaeidae.

The species of this genus are found in Europe, Africa and Northern America.

Species:

Ochodaeus adsequa 
Ochodaeus alius 
Ochodaeus asahinai

References

Beetles